Furkan Ansari (born 5 February 1948) is an Indian politician. He was elected a Member of Parliament to the 14th Lok Sabha from Godda constituency of Jharkhand being an Indian National Congress candidate. He is Senior INC Leader of Jharkhand and Member of Bihar and Jharkhand Legislative Assembly for five terms from 1980 to 2004. He is former MP of LS from Godda and ex - Cabinet Minister. His son Irfan Ansari is a Member of Legislative assembly from Jamtara constituency of Jharkhand being an Indian National Congress candidate.

References

1948 births
Living people
People from Deoghar district
India MPs 2004–2009
Lok Sabha members from Jharkhand
People from Godda district
Indian National Congress politicians from Jharkhand